Jefferson is an unincorporated community in Marengo County, Alabama, United States.  It is the birthplace of sculptor Geneva Mercer.

Demographics

Jefferson appeared on the 1870 and 1880 U.S. Censuses. In 1870, it reported 233 residents. Of those, 143 (61%) were black and 90 (39%) were white. Racial demographics in 1880 were not reported. These were the only two occasions on which it appeared on census records.

History
It was founded in 1810, before Marengo was a county or Alabama was a state.  Most of the original settlers were veterans of the American Revolution, including John Sample, John Gilmore, and Reuben Hildreth.  The village was named Jefferson in 1820, after Thomas Jefferson, and that year saw the first church established.  The population had reached 200 people by 1860 and the village contained two dry goods stores, one drugstore, a male and a female academy, a Masonic Lodge, a hotel, two tanneries, a wagon shop, and a blacksmith shop.

Geography

Historic sites
 Jefferson Historic District, added to the National Register of Historic Places on 13 December 1976.

Further reading
 Angela McMillan Howell. Raised Up Down Yonder: Growing Up Black in Rural Alabama (University Press of Mississippi; 2013) 224 pages; an ethnographic study of high school students in fictional Hamilton a pseudonym for the community near Jefferson and John Essex High School.

References

Unincorporated communities in Alabama
Unincorporated communities in Marengo County, Alabama
Populated places established in 1810